Nikolai Vasilyevich Gogol ( – ) was a Russian novelist, short story writer and playwright of Ukrainian origin.

Gogol was one of the first to use the technique of the grotesque, in works such as "The Nose", "Viy", "The Overcoat", and "Nevsky Prospekt". These stories, and others such as "Diary of a Madman", have also been noted for their proto-surrealist qualities. According to Viktor Shklovsky, Gogol's strange style of writing resembles the "ostranenie" technique of defamiliarization. His early works, such as Evenings on a Farm Near Dikanka, were influenced by his Ukrainian upbringing, Ukrainian culture and folklore. His later writing satirised political corruption in contemporary Russia (The Government Inspector, Dead Souls), although Gogol also enjoyed the patronage of Tsar Nicholas I who liked his work. The novel Taras Bulba (1835), the play Marriage (1842), and the short stories "The Tale of How Ivan Ivanovich Quarreled with Ivan Nikiforovich", "The Portrait" and "The Carriage", are also among his best-known works.

Many writers and critics have recognized Gogol's huge influence on Russian, Ukrainian and world literature. Gogol's influence was acknowledged by Fyodor Dostoevsky, Mikhail Saltykov-Shchedrin, Ryūnosuke Akutagawa, Franz Kafka, Mikhail Bulgakov, Vladimir Nabokov, Flannery O'Connor and others. Eugène-Melchior de Vogüé said: "We all came out from under Gogol's Overcoat."

Early life
Gogol was born in the Ukrainian Cossack town of Sorochyntsi, in the Poltava Governorate of the Russian Empire. His mother was descended from Leonty Kosyarovsky, an officer of the Lubny Regiment in 1710. His father Vasily Gogol-Yanovsky, who died when Gogol was 15 years old, was supposedly a descendant of Ukrainian Cossacks (see Lyzohub family) and belonged to the 'petty gentry'. His father wrote poetry in Ukrainian as well as Russian, and was an amateur playwright in his own theatre. As was typical of the left-bank Ukrainian gentry of the early nineteenth century, the family spoke Ukrainian as well as Russian. As a child, Gogol helped stage plays in his uncle's home theater.

In 1820, Nikolai Gogol went to a school of higher art in Nezhin (Nizhyn) (now Nizhyn Gogol State University) and remained there until 1828. It was there that he began writing. He was not popular among his schoolmates, who called him their "mysterious dwarf", but with two or three of them he formed lasting friendships. Very early he developed a dark and secretive disposition, marked by a painful self-consciousness and boundless ambition. Equally early he developed a talent for mimicry, which later made him a matchless reader of his own works and induced him to toy with the idea of becoming an actor.

On leaving school in 1828, Gogol went to Saint Petersburg, full of vague but ambitious hopes. He desired literary fame, and brought with him a Romantic poem of German idyllic life – Hans Küchelgarten, and had it published at his own expense, under the pseudonym "V. Alov." The magazines he sent it to almost universally derided it. He bought all the copies and destroyed them, swearing never to write poetry again.

Literary development

In 1831, the first volume of Gogol's Ukrainian stories (Evenings on a Farm Near Dikanka) was published, and met with immediate success. A second volume was published in 1832, followed by two volumes of stories entitled Mirgorod in 1835, and two volumes of miscellaneous prose entitled Arabesques. At this time, Russian editors and critics such as Nikolai Polevoy and Nikolai Nadezhdin saw Gogol as a regional Ukrainian writer, and used his works to illustrate the specific of Ukrainian national characters. The themes and style of these early prose works by Gogol, as well as his later drama, were similar to the work of Ukrainian-language writers and dramatists who were his contemporaries and friends, including Hryhory Kvitka-Osnovyanenko. However, Gogol's satire was much more sophisticated and unconventional.

At this time, Gogol developed a passion for Ukrainian Cossack history and tried to obtain an appointment to the history department at Saint Vladimir Imperial University of Kiev. Despite the support of Alexander Pushkin and Sergey Uvarov, the Russian minister of education, the appointment was blocked by a bureaucrat on the grounds that Gogol was unqualified. His fictional story Taras Bulba, based on the history of Zaporozhian Сossacks, was the result of this phase in his interests. During this time, he also developed a close and lifelong friendship with the historian and naturalist Mykhaylo Maksymovych.

In 1834, Gogol was made Professor of Medieval History at the University of St. Petersburg, a job for which he had no qualifications. The academic venture proved a disaster:He turned in a performance ludicrous enough to warrant satiric treatment in one of his own stories. After an introductory lecture made up of brilliant generalizations which the 'historian' had prudently prepared and memorized, he gave up all pretence at erudition and teaching, missed two lectures out of three, and when he did appear, muttered unintelligibly through his teeth. At the final examination, he sat in utter silence with a black handkerchief wrapped around his head, simulating a toothache, while another professor interrogated the students. Gogol resigned his chair in 1835.

Between 1832 and 1836, Gogol worked with great energy, and had extensive contact with Pushkin, but he still had not yet decided that his ambitions were to be fulfilled by success in literature. During this time, the Russian critics Stepan Shevyrev and Vissarion Belinsky, contradicting the earlier critics, reclassified Gogol from a Ukrainian to a Russian writer. It was only after the premiere of his comedy The Government Inspector (Revizor) at the Alexandrinsky Theatre in St. Petersbrug, on 19 April 1836, that he finally came to believe in his literary vocation. The comedy, a satire of Russian provincial bureaucracy, was staged thanks only to the intervention of the emperor, Nicholas I. The Tsar was personally present at the play's premiere, concluding that "there is nothing sinister in the comedy, as it is only a cheerful mockery of bad provincial officials."

From 1836 to 1848, Gogol lived abroad, travelling through Germany and Switzerland. Gogol spent the winter of 1836–37 in Paris, among Russian expatriates and Polish exiles, frequently meeting the Polish poets Adam Mickiewicz and Bohdan Zaleski. He eventually settled in Rome. For much of the twelve years from 1836, Gogol was in Italy, where he developed an adoration for Rome. He studied art, read Italian literature and developed a passion for opera.

Pushkin's death produced a strong impression on Gogol. His principal work during the years following Pushkin's death was the satirical epic Dead Souls. Concurrently, he worked at other tasks – recast Taras Bulba (1842) and The Portrait, completed his second comedy, Marriage (Zhenitba), wrote the fragment Rome and his most famous short story, "The Overcoat".

In 1841, the first part of Dead Souls was ready, and Gogol took it to Russia to supervise its printing. It appeared in Moscow in 1842, under a new title imposed by the censorship, The Adventures of Chichikov. The book established his reputation as one of the greatest prose writers in the language.

Later life and death

After the triumph of Dead Souls, Gogol's contemporaries came to regard him as a great satirist who lampooned the unseemly sides of Imperial Russia. They did not know that Dead Souls was but the first part of a planned modern-day counterpart to the Divine Comedy of Dante. The first part represented the Inferno; the second part would depict the gradual purification and transformation of the rogue Chichikov under the influence of virtuous publicans and governors – Purgatory.

In April 1848, Gogol returned to Russia from a pilgrimage to Jerusalem and passed his last years in restless movement throughout the country. While visiting the capitals, he stayed with friends such as Mikhail Pogodin and Sergey Aksakov. During this period, he also spent much time with his old Ukrainian friends, Maksymovych and Osyp Bodiansky. He intensified his relationship with a starets or spiritual elder, Matvey Konstantinovsky, whom he had known for several years. Konstantinovsky seems to have strengthened in Gogol the fear of perdition (damnation) by insisting on the sinfulness of all his imaginative work. Exaggerated ascetic practices undermined his health and he fell into a state of deep depression. On the night of 24 February 1852 he burned some of his manuscripts, which contained most of the second part of Dead Souls. He explained this as a mistake, a practical joke played on him by the Devil. Soon thereafter, he took to bed, refused all food, and died in great pain nine days later.

Gogol was mourned in the Saint Tatiana church at the Moscow University before his burial and then buried at the Danilov Monastery, close to his fellow Slavophile Aleksey Khomyakov. His grave was marked by a large stone (Golgotha), topped by a Russian Orthodox cross.

In 1931, with Russia now ruled by communists, Moscow authorities decided to demolish the monastery and had Gogol's remains transferred to the Novodevichy Cemetery. His body was discovered lying face down, which gave rise to the conspiracy theory that Gogol had been buried alive. The authorities moved the Golgotha stone to the new gravesite, but removed the cross; in 1952, the Soviets replaced the stone with a bust of Gogol. The stone was later reused for the tomb of Gogol's admirer Mikhail Bulgakov. In 2009, in connection with the bicentennial of Gogol's birth, the bust was moved to the museum at the Novodevichy Cemetery, and the original Golgotha stone was returned, along with a copy of the original Orthodox cross.

The first Gogol monument in Moscow, a Symbolist statue on Arbat Square, represented the sculptor Nikolay Andreyev's idea of Gogol rather than the real man. Unveiled in 1909, the statue received praise from Ilya Repin and from Leo Tolstoy as an outstanding projection of Gogol's tortured personality. Everything changed after the October Revolution. Joseph Stalin did not like the statue, and it was replaced by a more orthodox Socialist Realist monument in 1952. It took enormous efforts to save Andreyev's original work from destruction;  it stands in front of the house where Gogol died.

Style

D. S. Mirsky characterizes Gogol's universe as "one of the most marvellous, unexpected – in the strictest sense, original – worlds ever created by an artist of words".

A characteristic of Gogol's writing is his 'impressionist' vision of reality and people. He saw the outer world strangely metamorphosed, a singular gift particularly evident from the fantastic spatial transformations in his Gothic stories, "A Terrible Vengeance" and "A Bewitched Place". His pictures of nature are strange mounds of detail heaped on detail, resulting in an unconnected chaos of things: "His people are caricatures, drawn with the method of the caricaturist – which is to exaggerate salient features and to reduce them to geometrical pattern. But these cartoons have a convincingness, a truthfulness, and inevitability – attained as a rule by slight but definitive strokes of unexpected reality – that seems to beggar the visible world itself." According to Andrey Bely, Gogol's work influenced the emergence of Gothic romance, and served as a forerunner for absurdism and impressionism.

The aspect under which the mature Gogol sees reality is expressed by the Russian word poshlost', which means something similar to "triviality, banality, inferiority", moral and spiritual, widespread in some group or society. Like Sterne before him, Gogol was a great destroyer of prohibitions and of romantic illusions. He undermined Russian Romanticism by making vulgarity reign where only the sublime and the beautiful had before. "Characteristic of Gogol is a sense of boundless superfluity that is soon revealed as utter emptiness and a rich comedy that suddenly turns into metaphysical horror."
His stories often interweave pathos and mockery, while "The Tale of How Ivan Ivanovich Quarreled with Ivan Nikiforovich" begins as a merry farce and ends with the famous dictum, "It is dull in this world, gentlemen!"

Politics

It stunned Gogol when some critics interpreted The Government Inspector as an indictment of Tsarism despite Nicholas I's patronage of the play. Gogol himself, an adherent of the Slavophile movement, believed in a divinely inspired mission for both the House of Romanov and the Russian Orthodox Church. Like Fyodor Dostoyevsky, Gogol sharply disagreed with those Russians who preached constitutional monarchy and the disestablishment of the Orthodox Church. Gogol saw his work as a critique that would change Russia for the better.

After defending autocracy, serfdom, and the Orthodox Church in his book Selected Passages from Correspondence with his Friends (1847), Gogol came under attack from his former patron Vissarion Belinsky. The first Russian intellectual to publicly preach the economic theories of Karl Marx, Belinsky accused Gogol of betraying his readership by defending the status quo.

Influence and interpretations
Even before the publication of Dead Souls, Belinsky recognized Gogol as the first Russian-language realist writer and as the head of the Natural School, to which he also assigned such younger or lesser authors as Goncharov, Turgenev, Dmitry Grigorovich, Vladimir Dahl and Vladimir Sollogub. Gogol himself appeared skeptical about the existence of such a literary movement. Although he recognized "several young writers" who "have shown a particular desire to observe real life", he upbraided the deficient composition and style of their works. Nevertheless, subsequent generations of radical critics celebrated Gogol (the author in whose world a nose roams the streets of the Russian capital) as a great realist, a reputation decried by the Encyclopædia Britannica as "the triumph of Gogolesque irony".

The period of literary modernism saw a revival of interest in and a change of attitude towards Gogol's work. One of the pioneering works of Russian formalism was Eichenbaum's reappraisal of "The Overcoat". In the 1920s, a group of Russian short-story writers, known as the Serapion Brothers, placed Gogol among their precursors and consciously sought to imitate his techniques. The leading novelists of the period – notably Yevgeny Zamyatin and Mikhail Bulgakov – also admired Gogol and followed in his footsteps. In 1926, Vsevolod Meyerhold staged The Government Inspector as a "comedy of the absurd situation", revealing to his fascinated spectators a corrupt world of endless self-deception. In 1934, Andrei Bely published the most meticulous study of Gogol's literary techniques up to that date, in which he analyzed the colours prevalent in Gogol's work depending on the period, his impressionistic use of verbs, the expressive discontinuity of his syntax, the complicated rhythmical patterns of his sentences, and many other secrets of his craft. Based on this work, Vladimir Nabokov published a summary account of Gogol's masterpieces.

Gogol's impact on Russian literature has endured, yet various critics have appreciated his works differently. Belinsky, for instance, berated his horror stories as "moribund, monstrous works", while Andrei Bely counted them among his most stylistically daring creations. Nabokov especially admired Dead Souls, The Government Inspector, and "The Overcoat" as works of genius, proclaiming that "when, as in his immortal 'The Overcoat', Gogol really let himself go and pottered happily on the brink of his private abyss, he became the greatest artist that Russia has yet produced." Critics traditionally interpreted "The Overcoat" as a masterpiece of "humanitarian realism", but Nabokov and some other attentive readers argued that "holes in the language" make the story susceptible to interpretation as a supernatural tale about a ghostly double of a "small man". Of all Gogol's stories, "The Nose" has stubbornly defied all abstruse interpretations: D.S. Mirsky declared it "a piece of sheer play, almost sheer nonsense". In recent years, however, "The Nose" became the subject of several postmodernist and postcolonial interpretations.

Some critics have paid attention to the apparent anti-Semitism in Gogol's writings, as well as in those of his contemporary, Fyodor Dostoyevsky. Felix Dreizin and David Guaspari, for example, in their The Russian Soul and the Jew: Essays in Literary Ethnocentrism, discuss "the significance of the Jewish characters and the negative image of the Ukrainian Jewish community in Gogol's novel Taras Bulba, pointing out Gogol's attachment to anti-Jewish prejudices prevalent in Russian and Ukrainian culture." In Léon Poliakov's The History of Antisemitism, the author mentions that "The 'Yankel' from Taras Bulba indeed became the archetypal Jew in Russian literature. Gogol painted him as supremely exploitative, cowardly, and repulsive, albeit capable of gratitude. But it seems perfectly natural in the story that he and his cohorts be drowned in the Dniper by the Cossack lords. Above all, Yankel is ridiculous, and the image of the plucked chicken that Gogol used has made the rounds of great Russian authors."

Despite his portrayal of Jewish characters, Gogol left a powerful impression even on Jewish writers who inherited his literary legacy. Amelia Glaser has noted the influence of Gogol's literary innovations on Sholem Aleichem, who "chose to model much of his writing, and even his appearance, on Gogol... What Sholem Aleichem was borrowing from Gogol was a rural East European landscape that may have been dangerous, but could unite readers through the power of collective memory. He also learned from Gogol to soften this danger through laughter, and he often rewrites Gogol's Jewish characters, correcting anti-Semitic stereotypes and narrating history from a Jewish perspective."

In music and film
Gogol's oeuvre has also had an impact on Russia's non-literary culture, and his stories have been adapted numerous times into opera and film. The Russian composer Alfred Schnittke wrote the eight-part Gogol Suite as incidental music to The Government Inspector performed as a play, and Dmitri Shostakovich set The Nose as his first opera in 1928 – a peculiar choice of subject for what was meant to initiate the great tradition of Soviet opera. More recently, to celebrate the 200th anniversary of Gogol's birth in 1809, Vienna's renowned Theater an der Wien commissioned music and libretto for a full-length opera on the life of Gogol from Russian composer and writer Lera Auerbach.

More than 135 films have been based on Gogol's work, the most recent being The Girl in the White Coat (2011).

Legacy
Gogol has been featured many times on Russian and Soviet postage stamps; he is also well represented on stamps worldwide. Several commemorative coins have been issued in the USSR and Russia. In 2009, the National Bank of Ukraine issued a commemorative coin dedicated to Gogol. Streets have been named after Gogol in various cities, including Moscow, Sofia, Lipetsk, Odesa, Myrhorod, Krasnodar, Vladimir, Vladivostok, Penza, Petrozavodsk, Riga, Bratislava, Belgrade, Harbin and many other towns and cities.

Gogol is mentioned several times in Fyodor Dostoyevsky's Poor Folk and Crime and Punishment and Chekhov's The Seagull.

Ryūnosuke Akutagawa considered Gogol along with Edgar Poe his favorite writers.

Adaptations
BBC Radio 4 made a series of six Gogol short stories, entitled Three Ivans, Two Aunts and an Overcoat (2002, adaptations by Jim Poyser) starring Griff Rhys-Jones and Stephen Moore. The stories adapted were "The Two Ivans", "The Overcoat", "Ivan Fyodorovich Shponka and His Aunt", "The Nose", "The Mysterious Portrait" and "Diary of a Madman".

Gogol's short story "Christmas Eve" (literally the Russian title «Ночь перед Рождеством» translates as "The Night before Christmas") was adapted into operatic form by at least three East Slavic composers.  Ukrainian composer Mykola Lysenko wrote his Christmas Eve («Різдвяна ніч», with libretto in Ukrainian by Mykhailo Starytsky) in 1872.  Just two years later, in 1874, Tchaikovsky composed his version under the title Vakula the Smith (with Russian libretto by Yakov Polonsky) and revised it in 1885 as Cherevichki (The Tsarina's Slippers). In 1894 (i.e., just after Tchaikovsky's death), Rimsky-Korsakov wrote the libretto and music for his own opera based on the same story. "Christmas Eve" was also adapted into a film in 1961 entitled The Night Before Christmas. It was adapted also for radio by Adam Beeson and broadcast on BBC Radio 4 on 24 December 2008 and subsequently rebroadcast on both Radio 4 and Radio 4 Extra on Christmas Eve 2010, 2011 and 2015.

Gogol's story "Viy"  was adapted into film by Russian filmmakers four times: the original Viy in 1967; the horror film Vedma (aka The Power of Fear) in 2006; the action-horror film Viy in 2014; and the horror film Gogol Viy released in 2018. It was also adapted into the Russian FMV video game Viy: The Story Retold (2004). Outside of Russia, the film loosely served as the inspiration for Mario Bava's film Black Sunday (1960) and the South Korean horror film Evil Spirit: Viy (2008).

In 2016, Gogol's short story "The Portrait" was announced to be adapted into a feature film of the same name, by Anastasia Elena Baranoff and Elena Vladimir Baranoff.

The Russian TV-3 television series Gogol features Nikolai Gogol as a lead character and presents a fictionalized version of his life that mixes his history with elements from his various stories. The episodes were also released theatrically starting with Gogol. The Beginning in August 2017. A sequel entitled Gogol: Viy was released in April 2018 and the third film Gogol: Terrible Revenge debuted in August 2018.

In 1963, an animated version of Gogol's classic surrealist story "The Nose" was made by Alexandre Alexeieff and Claire Parker, using the pinscreen animation technique, for the National Film Board of Canada.

A definitive animated movie adaptation of Gogol's The Nose released in January 2020. The Nose or Conspiracy of Mavericks has been in production for about fifty years.

Bibliography

Notes

Citations

References
 Townsend, Dorian Aleksandra, From Upyr' to Vampire: The Slavic Vampire Myth in Russian Literature, Ph.D. Dissertation, School of German and Russian Studies, Faculty of Arts & Social Sciences, University of New South Wales, May 2011.

Further reading

External links

 
 
 
 
 Gogol : Magical realism
 
 Nikolay Gogol in Encyclopædia Britannica
 
 Мертвыя души [Dead Souls] From the Collections at the Library of Congress
 A quiz on Gogol at Goodreads
 Gogol House at Google Cultural Institute

 
1809 births
1852 deaths
People from Poltava Oblast
People from Mirgorodsky Uyezd
Eastern Orthodox writers
Magic realism writers
Mythopoeic writers
Dramatists and playwrights from the Russian Empire
Russian male dramatists and playwrights
Monarchists from the Russian Empire
Russian male novelists
Russian male short story writers
Ukrainian novelists
19th-century short story writers from the Russian Empire
19th-century writers from the Russian Empire
Nizhyn Gogol State University alumni
Saint Petersburg State University alumni
Burials at Novodevichy Cemetery
Ukrainian male writers